Ace Hotel is a chain of hotels headquartered in Los Angeles and New York City. Founded in 1999 in Seattle, it operates hotels primarily in the United States, with locations in Portland, Oregon; Brooklyn, New York City; Palm Springs, California; Seattle, Washington; Pittsburgh, Pennsylvania; Los Angeles, California; New Orleans, Louisiana; Kyoto, Japan; Toronto, Canada; Sydney, Australia; and Panama City, Panama.

History

In 1999, the first Ace Hotel was opened. Friends Alex Calderwood, Wade Weigel, and Doug Herrick purchased and transformed a Seattle halfway house into an affordable hotel that would appeal to the creative class. Calderwood and Weigel had previously founded Rudy's, a reinvigorated traditional barbershop concept they started in Seattle, which eventually expanded to more than a dozen locations, along with an experiential marketing company known as Neverstop, and an audiovisual arts platform known as ARO.Space with Pearl Jam co-founder Stone Gossard and Kung Faux creator Mic Neumann, who is credited for bringing in such artists as Kaws and Shepard Fairey to decorate the walls of various Rudy's and Ace Hotel locations.

In 2006, Jack Barron and Tungsten Partners founder Michael Bisordi joined as owners. The group then opened a second hotel in Portland, Oregon followed by properties in Palm Springs, California and New York City in 2009.

In 2011, Ace Hotel collaborated with Uslu Airlines to create a nail polish sold exclusively in the hotels' mini-bars.

In 2013, an Ace Hotel opened in the Shoreditch neighborhood of London, where Calderwood had defined a goal of opening a new Ace Hotel every "one to two years", before his untimely death at age 47 on November 16, 2013.

In 2014, a downtown Los Angeles location of the Ace Hotel opened in a former theatre, followed by Ace Hotel locations in Pittsburgh in 2015, New Orleans in 2016, and Chicago in 2017.

In 2020, an Ace Hotel location opened in Kyoto, Japan that was designed by Kengo Kuma. In September 2020, it was announced that Ace Hotel London Shoreditch would not reopen after being closed because of the Covid-19 pandemic.

In 2021, Ace Hotel opened locations in Brooklyn, New York; Toronto, Canada and Sydney, Australia.

In 2022, Ace Hotel filed for arbitration against David Paz's Omnia Group and was awarded $10.4 million dollars after alleging the property owner of a Manhattan location managed by the Ace Hotel Group hurt the brand and future earnings by taking a deal with the city of New York to house the homeless during the Covid-19 pandemic. 

In 2023, the Wall Street Journal reported that the Portland, Oregon based hospitality firm, Sortis Holdings, had reached an agreement to acquire the Ace Hotel Group brand and its hotel management company for $85 million dollars in an all cash transaction.

Locations
According to Calderwood, the style and furnishing of each Ace property is designed to reflect its location, with an eye towards re-imagining properties that are "challenged."
Ace Hotel Seattle is a former Salvation Army halfway house located in the Belltown neighborhood. 
Ace Hotel & Swim Club in Palm Springs, CA is a converted Howard Johnson motel, formerly a Westward Ho. King's Highway, the hotel's on-site diner, is a converted Denny's.  There are two bars, the Amigo Room, and poolside, the Short Bus. The remodel was a collaboration with L.A.-based design firm, Commune.
Ace Hotel Portland occupies the former Clyde Hotel in downtown Portland. In its former incarnation, the hotel's lobby served as the setting for a scene from the film Drugstore Cowboy. The property is listed on the National Register of Historic Places.
Ace Hotel New York worked with Roman and Williams to redesign the former Hotel Breslin, a 1904 building in Midtown Manhattan. This location features a Stumptown Coffee and Chef April Bloomfield's  Michelin-starred The Breslin restaurant.
Ace Hotel London is in London's Shoreditch arts district, on the site of the original Shoreditch Empire music hall. The groups first location outside of the US, Ace Hotel London Shoreditch closed in September 2020.
American Trade Hotel is a restored five-story stucco building in the Casco Viejo historical district of Panama City.
Ace Hotel Downtown Los Angeles opened in January 2014 in the historic United Artists Building, with 180 rooms and a restored United Artists Theater performance venue.
Ace Hotel Pittsburgh opened in an historic YMCA building in the city's East Liberty neighborhood in December 2015, and closed in 2021.
Ace Hotel New Orleans opened in March 2016 in a 1928 Art Deco building in New Orleans' Warehouse District.
Ace Hotel Kyoto opened on June 11, 2020 in a building originally designed by Tetsuro Yoshida for the Kyoto Central Telephone Company in 1926. The registered Taishō era property was redesigned by Kengo Kuma.
Ace Hotel Brooklyn
Ace Hotel Toronto opened July 2022. The first Canadian site for the Ace Hotel, the property is notable as their first original build.
Ace Hotel Sydney

In popular culture
The 2011 episode "Blunderbuss" of the sketch comedy series Portlandia had a sketch set at the "Deuce Hotel", where the obnoxiously hip staff hand out complimentary turntables and typewriters to all guests; it was a parody specifically of Ace Hotel Portland.

On her song Ace, rapper Noname talks about being at Ace Hotel in London.

Bon Iver makes a reference to the Ace Hotel Los Angeles in the song "33 "GOD"" on the album 22, A Million.

References

External links
 
 Creative team website
 Ace Hotel blog

Hotel chains in the United States
Companies based in Portland, Oregon
Hotels in Washington (state)
Hotels in Portland, Oregon
Privately held companies based in Oregon
1999 establishments in Oregon
Boutique resort chains
Hotels in London
Hotels in Manhattan